Peter Bernhard Wilhelm Heine, better known as Wilhelm (or William) Heine (January 30, 1827 in Dresden – October 5, 1885 in Lößnitz near Dresden) was a German-American artist, world traveller and writer as well as an officer during the American Civil War.

Early life
Heine was born in Dresden, the son of Ferdinand Heine, a comedian engaged at the Dresden Court Theatre. His family connections included composer Richard Wagner, whose father had been a family friend.

Heine studied at the Royal Academy of Art in Dresden and in the studio of Julius Hübner. Then he continued his artistic studies for three years in Paris. He returned to Dresden getting work as a scene designer for the court theatre and giving painting classes. He fled to New York in 1849, following the suppression of the May Uprising in Dresden in which he participated. In this he was aided by Alexander von Humboldt.

Career
He set up his artist studio at 515 Broadway, and soon established his reputation as an artist. After meeting the archaeologist and diplomat, Ephraim George Squier, Heine was invited to accompany him, as an artist, on his consular duties to Central America. Proceeding ahead of Squier, he collected and recorded indigenous plants and animals and compiled notes for future publications. Until Squier arrived, Heine stood in as consul, negotiating a commercial agreement between the Central American countries and the United States, which he delivered to Washington. The record of this expedition was published in 1853 as the Wanderbilder aus Zentralamerika. While in Washington, he met President Millard Fillmore and Commodore Matthew Perry, and was selected from among several scores of applicants for the post of official artist to the Perry expedition to Japan.

Japan
Nominally attached to Perry's expedition as an Acting Master's Mate; he served on the flagship  under Sydney Smith Lee. Heine visited Okinawa, the Bonin Islands, Yokohama, Shimoda and Hakodate during 1853 and 1854 (Edo, however, remained closed to the members of the American expedition, and Heine was not to visit the city until 1860, when he returned to Japan as a member of the Prussian Expedition). The sketches he produced of the places he visited and the people he encountered there, together with the daguerreotypes taken by his colleague Eliphalet Brown Jr., formed the basis of an official iconography of the American expedition to Japan which remains an important record of the country as it was before the foreigners arrived in force.

Upon his return to New York in 1855 he published several books: a collection of prints entitled Graphic Scenes of the Japan Expedition; 400 sketches which were included in Perry's official report; and his memoirs, Reiss um die Welt nach Japan (Leipzig, 1856). The memoirs were very successful, and were immediately translated into both French and Dutch.

Further expeditions
Going back to Prussia he published a German translation of the report of the Rodgers Expedition sent by the US government to Japan, China and Okhotsk Seas, under the title Die Expedition in die Seen von China, Japan und Okhotsk (Leipzig, 1858-9) and Japan und Seine Bewohner  (Leipzig, 1860). Here he urged the Prussian government to send more expeditions to Asia before the Americans became established there. This was taken up and while in Berlin he received an invitation to join the Eulenberg Expedition as official artist once again, and was simultaneously given a premium to send back reports for a Köln newspaper. During this trip he met up with Mikhail Bakunin in Yokohama, who was in the process of returning to Europe, following his escape from Siberia. Eventually, in 1864, he published his major work, a voluminous book on travel in the Orient, Eine Weltreise um die nördliche Hemisphäre in Verbindung mit der Ostasiatischen Expedition in den Jahren 1860 und 1861 (Leipzig, two volumes).

American Civil War and later life
Learning of the outbreak of the American Civil War; the Forty-Eighter returned and volunteered for the Union Army. He joined the 1st Maryland Infantry Regiment before being commissioned a Captain of Topographical Engineers. Serving in the Army of the Potomac, Heine was captured during the Peninsula Campaign and briefly was in Libby Prison before being exchanged. In late 1862 he was arrested and accused of revealing too much information of the Union defenses in his drawings. Also being wounded he was honorably discharged as "unfit for service." In 1863 he rejoined the army as Colonel of the 103rd New York Infantry, a regiment made up mainly of German-Americans. Later he commanded a brigade and then a small division in the Army of West Virginia. In 1865 he was made a Brevet Brigadier General but was accused of disobedience and left the army. In the next year he became a U.S. clerk to the Paris and Liverpool consulates. After the establishment of the Hohenzollern Empire in Germany in 1871, he returned to Dresden where he wrote his last book about Japan, Japan, Beiträge zur Kenntnis des Landes und seiner Bewohner (Berlin, 1873–80).

Selected works
 1856 -- Graphic Scenes in the Japan Expedition. New York: G. P. Putnam & Company. OCLC 3095611 Includes ten metal-plate illustrations: (1) Portrait of Commodore M.C. Perry;(2) Macao from Penha Hill; (3) Pagoda of Whampoa; (4) Old China Street in Canton; (5) Kung-Twa, at On-Na, Lew Chew; (6) Mia, or road-side chapel, at Yoku-Hama; (7) Temple at Ben-Teng, in the Harbor of Simoda; (8) Street and bridge at Simoda; (9) Temple of Ha-Tshu-Man-Ya Tschu-Ro, at Simoda; (10) Grave-yard at the Simoda, Dio Zenge.
 1856 -- Reise um die Erde nach Japan an Bord der Expeditions-Escadron unter Com. Perry den Jahren 1853, 54, und 55, unternommen im Auftrage der Regierung der Vereinigten Staaten. Leipzig: Hermann Costenoble.
 1857 -- Wanderbilder aus Central-Amerika: Skizzen eines deutschen Malers (Walking pictures from cent ral America: Sketches of a German Painter) Leipzig: Hermann Costenoble. 
 1864 -- Eine Weltreise um die nördliche Hemisphäre in Verbindung mit der Ostasiatischen Expedition in den Jahren 1860 und 1861 (A voyage round the world around the Northern Hemisphere in Connection with the East Asian Expedition, 1860-1861). Leipzig: F.A. Brockhaus. OCLC 63836384
 1865 -- Treasury of Travel and Adventure in North and South America, Europe, Asia and Africa: A Book for Young and Old. New York: D. Appleton and Company. OCLC 48859643
 1871 -- Japan, Beiträge zur Kenntnis des Landes und seiner Bewohner (Japan, contribution to the knowledge of the country and its inhabitants). Berlin: P. Bette. OCLC 82741141

Notes

References
 United States National Capital Sesquicentennial Commission. (1950). American Processional, 1492-1900. Washington, D.C." Corcoran Gallery of Art. OCLC 48507819
 Shedlock, John South. (1890).  Richard Wagner's Letters to His Dresden Friends. London: H. Grevel. OCLC 1708345
 Sebastian Dobson: "Getrennte Ansichten: Wilhelm Heine und Albert Berg in Japan. / Split Visions: Wilhelm Heine and Albert Berg in Japan" In: Sebastian Dobson & Sven Saaler (Hg./Eds.): Unter den Augen des Preußen-Adlers. Lithographien, Zeichnungen und Photographien der Teilnehmer der Eulenburg-Expedition in Japan, 1860-61./ Under Eagle Eyes. Lithographs, Drawings & Photographs from the Prussian Expedition to Japan, 1860-61. München 2012 (2., revised edition), S. 125–191.
 Sebastian Dobson: "Unbeabsichtigte Folgen: Photographie und die Eulenburg-Expedition. / Unintended Consequences: Photography and the Prussian East Asian Expedition". In: Ebda., S. 255-315.
 Hirner, Andrea: Wilhelm Heine. Ein weltreisender Maler zwischen Dresden, Japan und Amerika. Radebeul 2009.
 Andrea Hirner: "Das Leben und die Reisen des Wilhelm Heine." In: Streifzüge durchs alte Japan. Philipp Franz von Siebold, Wilhelm Heine. Herausgegeben von Markus Mergenthaler im Auftrag des Knauf-Museums Iphofen. Dettelbach 2013, S. 74-99.
 Bruno J. Richtsfeld: "Wilhelm Heines Japan-Gemälde im Staatlichen Museum für Völkerkunde München". In: Münchner Beiträge zur Völkerkunde, vol. 13, 2009, p. 211–240.
 Bruno J. Richtsfeld: "Impressionen aus Japan. Die Wilhelm Heine zugeschriebenen Japan-Gemälde im Staatlichen Museum für Völkerkunde München." In: Streifzüge durchs alte Japan. Philipp Franz von Siebold, Wilhelm Heine. Herausgegeben von Markus Mergenthaler im Auftrag des Knauf-Museums Iphofen. Dettelbach 2013, S. 100–117.

External links

osugi-sakae

1827 births
1885 deaths
Artists from Dresden
German-American Forty-Eighters
United States Navy officers
Union Army colonels